Ranikhet Uttarakhand Legislative Assembly constituency is one of the 70 constituencies in the Uttarakhand Legislative Assembly of Uttarakhand a northern state of India. Ranikhet is also part of Almora Lok Sabha constituency. Before 2000, this constituency was part of Uttar Pradesh Legislative Assembly

Members of Legislative Assembly

1951-62s: Constituency does not exist

See Ranikhet South Assembly constituency

Election results

2022

See also

 Ranikhet South Assembly constituency
 Ranikhet North Assembly constituency
 Ranikhet
 Almora district
 List of constituencies of the Uttarakhand Legislative Assembly

References

External links
 

Assembly constituencies of Uttarakhand
Almora district